The 1967 Bowling Green Falcons football team was an American football team that represented Bowling Green State University in the Mid-American Conference (MAC) during the 1967 NCAA University Division football season. In their third and final season under head coach Bob Gibson, the Falcons compiled a 6–4 record (2–4 against MAC opponents), finished in a tie for fifth place in the MAC, and outscored opponents by a combined total of 131 to 130.

The team's statistical leaders included P.J. Nyitray with 846 passing yards, Bob Zimpfer with 538 rushing yards, and Eddie Jones with 374 receiving yards.

Schedule

References

Bowling Green
Bowling Green Falcons football seasons
Bowling Green Falcons football